Giuseppina D'Agostino is a Canadian lawyer and legal scholar specializing in intellectual property law who teaches at Osgoode Hall Law School. She is regularly called upon by the Canadian Federal and Provincial governments for advice and is a cited authority at the Supreme Court of Canada.

Life
She earned an LL.B. at Osgoode Hall Law School and a Masters and D.Phil. degrees at the University of Oxford where she formerly lectured. She is a visiting scholar at the law school of Stanford University.

She is the author of Copyright, Contracts, Creators: New Media, New Rules (Cheltenham Edward Elgar 2010) and The Common Law of Intellectual Property: Essays in Honour of Professor David Vaver, edited with Dr. Catherine Ng and Lionel Bently, law professor at the University of Cambridge, (Oxford: Hart Publishing 2010).

She is the founder and Editor-in-Chief of the IPilogue (www.iposgoode.ca), the first IP law blog of its kind.

Works

References

Canadian lawyers
Academic staff of the Osgoode Hall Law School
Year of birth missing (living people)
Place of birth missing (living people)
Osgoode Hall Law School alumni
Alumni of the University of Oxford
Living people